Plicosepalus acaciae (syn. Loranthus acaciae), the acacia strap flower, is a species of hemiparasitic flowering plant in the family Loranthaceae. It is native to northeastern Africa, the Levant, and the Arabian Peninsula. As its common and scientific names suggest, it parasitizes acacias; Vachellia tortilis subsp. raddiana (formerly Acacia raddiana) and V. t. subsp. tortilis (formerly A. tortilis). It seeds are dispersed by the white-spectacled bulbul (Pycnonotus xanthopygos).

References

Loranthaceae
Parasitic plants
Flora of Northeast Tropical Africa
Flora of Sinai
Flora of Palestine (region)
Flora of Lebanon
Flora of the Arabian Peninsula
Plants described in 1985